Owston is a small village and civil parish in the Metropolitan Borough of Doncaster in rural South Yorkshire, England. It had a population of 170 in 2001, which fell to 145 according to the 2011 Census.

The name 'Owston' is of Old Scandinavian and Old English origin. It means 'East farmstead', being composed of the Old Scandinavian word austr ('east') and the Old English word tun ('farmstead'). In the Domesday Book, the village was recorded as Austhun.

John de St Paul, Archbishop of Dublin, was born in Owston in about 1295. He was sometimes referred to as John de Owston.

Close to the village is a site of special scientific interest called Owston Hay Meadows which is the second best example of neutral grassland hay meadow in South Yorkshire. The site consists of three small fields which together cover 13½ acres (5½ hectares) and were notified in 1979.

The parish church of All Saints is Grade I listed, dating back to 1180.

Nearby Owston Hall was declared a Grade II listed building in 1967, its grounds are used by the Robin Hood Golf Club of Doncaster.

See also
Listed buildings in Owston, South Yorkshire

References

External links

Villages in Doncaster
Civil parishes in South Yorkshire